The 2015 season was IFK Norrköping's 118th in existence, their 75th season in Allsvenskan and 5th consecutive season in the league. The club competed in 2015 Allsvenskan, 2014–15 Svenska Cupen (starting with group stage after qualification previous season) and 2015–16 Svenska Cupen (qualification for next season group stage). The season began with 2014–15 Svenska Cupen group stage on 22 February, with 2015 Allsvenskan starting on 4 April. The league ended with the last match on 31 October 2015, in which they became league champions, and the last match of the season was 2015 Svenska Supercupen on 8 November where IFK Norrköping, as champions, met 2014–15 Svenska Cupen winners, IFK Göteborg.

On 4 October 2015, with three matches remaining in 2015 Allsvenskan, IFK Norrköping secured a top 3 finish and a spot in European competitions for the next season. If they win the league, they will compete in 2016–17 UEFA Champions League and if they finish as runners-up or third-placed team they will compete in 2016–17 UEFA Europa League.

IFK Norrköping won the 2015 Allsvenskan in the last match of the season on 31 October 2015, defeating the champions from the previous season, Malmö FF, with 2–0. By winning 2015 Allsvenskan they qualified for 2016–17 UEFA Champions League.

One week after becoming champions of 2015 Allsvenskan, IFK Norrköping took their second title of the season when they defeated 2014–15 Svenska Cupen winners, IFK Göteborg with 3–0 in 2015 Svenska Supercupen.

Squad statistics
Source: Soccerway and Competitions.

Appearances and goals
Numbers in parentheses denote appearances as substitute.
{| class="wikitable plainrowheaders" style="text-align:center"
|-
! rowspan="2" style="width:40px;"|
! rowspan="2" style="width:40px;"|
! rowspan="2" style="width:80px;"|
! rowspan="2" style="width:180px;"|Name
! colspan="2" style="width:120px;"|Allsvenskan
! colspan="2" style="width:120px;"|2014–15Svenska Cupen
! colspan="2" style="width:120px;"|2015–16Svenska Cupen
! colspan="2" style="width:120px;"|SvenskaSupercupen
! colspan="2" style="width:120px;"|Total
|-
! style="width:60px;"|
! style="width:60px;"|Goals
! style="width:60px;"|
! style="width:60px;"|Goals
! style="width:60px;"|
! style="width:60px;"|Goals
! style="width:60px;"|
! style="width:60px;"|Goals
! style="width:60px;"|
! style="width:60px;"|Goals
|-
|1
|GK
|
!scope="row"|Andreas Vaikla

|0
|0

|0
|0

|0
|0

|0
|0

!0
!0
|-
|4
|DF
|
!scope="row"|Andreas Johansson

|29
|2

|4
|0

|1
|0

|1
|0

!35
!2
|-
|5
|FW
|
!scope="row"|Christoffer Nyman

|29
|10

|0
|0

|1
|2

|1
|1

!31
!13
|-
|6
|DF
|
!scope="row"|Linus Wahlqvist

|29
|3

|3 (1)
|0

|1
|0

|1
|0

!34 (1)
!3
|-
|7
|MF
|
!scope="row"|Alexander Fransson

|29
|5

|4
|0

|1
|0

|1
|1

!35
!6
|-
|8
|MF
|
!scope="row"|Rawez Lawan

|1 (20)
|1

|0
|0

|0 (1)
|1

|0
|0

!1 (21)
!2
|-
|9
|MF
|
!scope="row"|Arnór Ingvi Traustason

|29
|7

|4
|2

|0
|0

|1
|0

!34
!9
|-
|10
|FW
|
!scope="row"|Emir Kujović

|29
|21

|3
|0

|0
|0

|1
|1

!33
!22
|-
|11
|DF
|
!scope="row"|Christopher Telo

|18 (5)
|0

|4
|0

|0
|0

|0 (1)
|0

!22 (6)
!0
|-
|14
|MF
|
!scope="row"|Nicklas Bärkroth

|15 (3)
|0

|4
|2

|1
|0

|1
|0

!21 (3)
!2
|-
|15
|DF
|
!scope="row"|Marcus Falk-Olander

|2 (3)
|0

|1
|0

|0
|0

|0 (1)
|0

!3 (4)
!0
|-
|16
|FW
|
!scope="row"|Joel Enarsson

|1 (12)
|0

|1 (2)
|0

|0 (1)
|0

|0
|0

!2 (15)
!0
|-
|17
|FW
|
!scope="row"|Alhaji Kamara

|3 (11)
|6

|4
|3

|1
|2

|0
|0

!8 (11)
!11
|-
|20
|MF
|
!scope="row"|Daniel Sjölund

|28
|2

|4
|0

|1
|0

|1
|0

!34
!2
|-
|21
|DF
|
!scope="row"|Andreas Hadenius

|6 (7)
|0

|0 (3)
|0

|0
|0

|0
|0

!6 (10)
!0
|-
|23
|DF
|
!scope="row"|David Boo Wiklander

|22 (1)
|0

|0 (1)
|0

|1
|0

|1
|0

!24 (2)
!0
|-
|24
|MF
|
!scope="row"|Gentrit Citaku

|1 (6)
|0

|0 (3)
|1

|1
|0

|0
|0

!2 (9)
!1
|-
|25
|DF
|
!scope="row"|Filip Dagerstål

|4 (2)
|1

|3
|0

|0
|0

|0 (1)
|0

!7 (3)
!1
|-
|26
|DF
|
!scope="row"|Adnan Kojić

|0
|0

|0
|0

|0
|0

|0
|0

!0
!0
|-
|27
|MF
|
!scope="row"|Tesfaldet Tekie

|2 (4)
|0

|0
|0

|0 (1)
|0

|0
|0

!2 (5)
!0
|-
|30
|DF
|
!scope="row"|Nikola Tkalčić

|23 (4)
|2

|1
|0

|1
|0

|1
|0

!26 (4)
!2
|-
|91
|GK
|
!scope="row"|David Mitov Nilsson

|30
|0

|2
|0

|1
|0

|1
|0

!34
!0
|-
!colspan="12" scope="col"|Players out on loan
|-
|19
|MF
|
!scope="row"|Mirza Halvadžić

|0 (1)
|0

|0 (2)
|0

|0
|0

|0
|0

!0 (3)
!0
|-
|29
|GK
|
!scope="row"|Edvard Setterberg

|0
|0

|0
|0

|0
|0

|0
|0

!0
!0
|-
!colspan="12" scope="col"|Players that left the club during the season
|-
|1
|GK
|
!scope="row"|Marcus Sahlman

|0
|0

|2
|0

|0
|0

|0
|0

!2
!0
|-
|22
|DF
|
!scope="row"|Christopher Meneses

|0
|0

|0
|0

|0
|0

|0
|0

!0
!0

Goalscorers
{| class="wikitable" style="text-align: center;"	
|-	
! style="width:40px;"|Rank
! style="width:40px;"|Position
! style="width:180px;"|Name
! style="width:120px;"|Allsvenskan
! style="width:120px;"|2014–15 Sv. Cup
! style="width:120px;"|2015–16 Sv. Cup
! style="width:120px;"|SvenskaSupercupen
! style="width:120px;"|Total
|-
|1
|FW
|align=left| Emir Kujović
|21
|0
|0
|1
!22
|-
|2
|FW
|align=left| Christoffer Nyman
|10
|0
|2
|1
!13
|-
|3
|FW
|align=left| Alhaji Kamara
|6
|3
|2
|0
!11
|-
|4
|MF
|align=left| Arnór Ingvi Traustason
|7
|2
|0
|0
!9
|-
|5
|MF
|align=left| Alexander Fransson
|5
|0
|0
|1
!6
|-
|6
|DF
|align=left| Linus Wahlqvist
|3
|0
|0
|0
!3
|-
|rowspan="5"|7
|MF
|align=left| Nicklas Bärkroth
|0
|2
|0
|0
!2
|-
|DF
|align=left| Andreas Johansson
|2
|0
|0
|0
!2
|-
|MF
|align=left| Rawez Lawan
|1
|0
|1
|0
!2
|-
|MF
|align=left| Daniel Sjölund
|2
|0
|0
|0
!2
|-
|DF
|align=left| Nikola Tkalčić
|2
|0
|0
|0
!2
|-
|rowspan="2"|12
|MF
|align=left| Gentrit Citaku
|0
|1
|0
|0
!1
|-
|DF
|align=left| Filip Dagerstål
|1
|0
|0
|0
!1
|-
!colspan="3"|TOTALS
! 60
! 8
! 5
! 3
! 76

Disciplinary record
{|class="wikitable"  style="text-align: center;"
|-
! rowspan="2" style="width:40px;"|Rank
! rowspan="2" style="width:40px;"|Position
! rowspan="2" style="width:180px;"|Name
! colspan="2" style="width:110px;"|Allsvenskan
! colspan="2" style="width:110px;"|2014–15 Sv. Cup
! colspan="2" style="width:110px;"|2015–16 Sv. Cup
! colspan="2" style="width:140px;"|SvenskaSupercupen
! colspan="2" style="width:110px;"|Total
|-
!  style="width:55px;"|
!  style="width:55px;"|
!  style="width:55px;"|
!  style="width:55px;"|
!  style="width:55px;"|
!  style="width:55px;"|
!  style="width:55px;"|
!  style="width:55px;"|
!  style="width:55px;"|
!  style="width:55px;"|
|-
|1
|MF
|align=left| Daniel Sjölund

|9
|0

|1
|0

|0
|0

|0
|0

!10
!0
|-
|rowspan="2"|2
|MF
|align=left| Arnór Ingvi Traustason

|2
|0

|2
|0

|0
|0

|1
|0

!5
!0
|-
|DF
|align=left| Linus Wahlqvist

|4
|0

|1
|0

|0
|0

|0
|0

!5
!0
|-
|4
|FW
|align=left| Emir Kujović

|4
|0

|0
|0

|0
|0

|0
|0

!4
!0
|-
|rowspan="5"|5
|MF
|align=left| Nicklas Bärkroth

|2
|0

|1
|0

|0
|0

|0
|0

!3
!0
|-
|MF
|align=left| Gentrit Citaku

|2
|0

|0
|0

|1
|0

|0
|0

!3
!0
|-
|MF
|align=left| Alexander Fransson

|2
|0

|1
|0

|0
|0

|0
|0

!3
!0
|-
|DF
|align=left| Andreas Johansson

|2
|0

|1
|0

|0
|0

|0
|0

!3
!0
|-
|FW
|align=left| Alhaji Kamara

|2
|0

|1
|0

|0
|0

|0
|0

!3
!0
|-
|rowspan="2"|10
|DF
|align=left| Andreas Hadenius

|2
|0

|0
|0

|0
|0

|0
|0

!2
!0
|-
|FW
|align=left| Christoffer Nyman

|2
|0

|0
|0

|0
|0

|0
|0

!2
!0
|-
|rowspan="5"|12
|DF
|align=left| David Boo Wiklander

|1
|0

|0
|0

|0
|0

|0
|0

!1
!0
|-
|DF
|align=left| Filip Dagerstål

|1
|0

|0
|0

|0
|0

|0
|0

!1
!0
|-
|MF
|align=left| Rawez Lawan

|1
|0

|0
|0

|0
|0

|0
|0

!1
!0
|-
|GK
|align=left| David Mitov Nilsson

|1
|0

|0
|0

|0
|0

|0
|0

!1
!0
|-
|DF
|align=left| Christopher Telo

|1
|0

|0
|0

|0
|0

|0
|0

!1
!0
|-
!colspan=3|Total!!38!!0!!8!!0!!1!!0!!1!!0!!48!!0

Competitions

Overall

Overview

{| class="wikitable" style="text-align: center"
|-
!rowspan=2|Competition
!colspan=8|Record
|-
!
!
!
!
!
!
!
!
|-
| Allsvenskan

|-
| 2014–15 Svenska Cupen

|-
| 2015–16 Svenska Cupen

|-
| Svenska Supercupen

|-
! Total

Note: Only matches during 2015 are included, otherwise they would be counted twice (next season as well).

Allsvenskan

League table

Results summary

Results by matchday

Matches
On 21 January 2015, the fixtures for the forthcoming season were announced.

Times up to 24 October 2015 (matches 1–28) are CEST (UTC+2), thereafter (matches 29–30) times are CET (UTC+1). This because of the use of Daylight saving time in Sweden.

Score overview

Note: IFK Norrköping goals is listed first.

Svenska Cupen

Svenska Cupen, unlike Allsvenskan, spans over two seasons, with qualification in the fall and group stage and final stages in the spring. 
Therefore, IFK Norrköping will compete in both 2014–15 Svenska Cupen (group stage and final stages) and 2015–16 Svenska Cupen (qualification for next year group stage and final stages) for the 2015 season.

2014–15 Svenska Cupen

2014–15 Svenska Cupen were played during the fall in 2014 and in the spring of 2015, with the first two rounds in 2014 and the group stage and final stages in the beginning of 2015.

Group stage

IFK Norrköping were drawn in a group with Djurgårdens IF (first tier), Ängelholms FF (second tier) and Norrby IF (third tier) with the winner of the group advancing to the final stages (quarter-finals). IFK Norrköping won their first two matches against Norrby IF and Ängelholms FF, which was enough to win the group (on goal differential) despite losing to Djurgårdens IF in the last match. This meant IFK Norrköping advanced to the final stages.

Times are CET (UTC+1).

Knockout stage
IFK Norrköping qualified for the knockout stage as group stage winners, but they were unseeded in the quarter-final draw because they were not one of the four teams with the best record in the group stage. All of the winners in the group stage were teams that would be participating in 2015 Allsvenskan, so IFK Norrköping was drawn against BK Häcken in a draw with many tough opponents (especially since being unseeded). BK Häcken had the advantage of playing at home since they were the seeded team and, despite scoring the first goal, IFK Norrköping was not able to defeat BK Häcken away from home and lost with the final score 3–1. It was Gunnar Heiðar Þorvaldsson, who previously played for IFK Norrköping, that scored a brace for BK Häcken to turn the match around, and Simon Gustafson ended the scoring with the 3–1 goal.

2015–16 Svenska Cupen

2015–16 Svenska Cupen will be played during the fall in 2015 and in the spring of 2016, with the first two rounds in 2015 and the group stage and final stages in the beginning of 2016.

Round 2
IFK Norrköping entered Svenska Cupen in the second round (all teams from top tier Allsvenskan and second tier Superettan receive bye to this round). They were seeded in the draw together with all the other teams from Allsvenskan and Superettan, and they were drawn against Akropolis IF from Division 1 (fourth tier). The match was played on 20 August 2015 and it ended as a 5–0 win for IFK Norrköping, who qualified for the group stage to be played in the beginning of the next season.

Times are CET (UTC+1).

Svenska Supercupen

Svenska Supercupen, is a cup being played between league champions and cup winners, with the league winners being the home team. The 2015 Svenska Supercupen was played between 2015 Allsvenskan champions, IFK Norrköping, and 2014–15 Svenska Cupen winners, IFK Göteborg (runners-up in Allsvenskan), at Nya Parken, Norrköping on 8 November 2015. IFK Norrköping defeated IFK Göteborg with 3–0 and won their second title of the season.

Times are CET (UTC+1).

References

IFK Norrköping seasons
IFK Norrkoping
Swedish football championship-winning seasons